Chorangiosis is a placental pathology characterized by an abundance of blood vessels within the chorionic villi.

Associations
It is associated with gestational diabetes, smoking and high altitude.

Diagnosis
It is diagnosed by a microscopic examination of the placenta.

Commonly used criteria from Altshuler are: "a minimum of 10 villi, each with 10 or more vascular channels, in 10 or more areas of 3 or more random, non-infarcted placental areas when using a ×10 ocular."  The Altshuler criteria are not theoretically rigorous, as they do not define the area.  Normal villi have up to five vascular channels.

See also
Chorangioma

Additional images

References

External links 

Health issues in pregnancy